To Have and to Hold or To Have & to Hold may refer to:

Phrases
 "...to have and to hold", a phrase commonly used in Christian marriage vows
 The habendum clause in property transfer, in English and American real estate law

Film
 To Have and to Hold (1916 film), a lost American silent film directed by George Melford, based on the 1899 Johnston novel
 To Have and to Hold (1922 film), a lost American silent film directed by George Fitzmaurice, based on the 1899 Johnston novel, a remake of the 1916 film
 To Have and to Hold (1951 film), a British film directed by Godfrey Grayson
 To Have & to Hold (1996 film), an Australian film directed by John Hillcoat
 To Have and to Hold, a 1963 British film directed by Herbert Wise

Television
 To Have & to Hold (American TV series), 1998 television series
 To Have & to Hold (Philippine TV series), 2021 television series
 To Have and to Hold, a 1986 eight-part television drama series based on the  Deborah Moggach novel To Have and to Hold
 To Have and to Hold, a 2006 television movie starring Justine Bateman
 "To Have and to Hold", episode three of the fourth season of Medium (2008)
 "To Have and to Hold", episode four of the sixth season of Mad Men (2013)
 "To Have and to Hold", episode four of the fourth season of Inside No. 9 (2018)

Literature
 To Have and to Hold (Johnston novel), an 1899 novel by American author Mary Johnston
 To Have and to Hold (Moggach novel), a 1986 novel by Deborah Moggach
 To Have and to Hold: An Intimate History of Collectors and Collecting, a 2003 book by Philipp Blom
 To Have and to Hold, the American title for the 2004 Spellbound (Green novel)

Music
 "To Have and to Hold", a song from Depeche Mode's 1987 album Music for the Masses
 "To Have and to Hold", a song from Katrina and the Waves 1989 album Break of Hearts